Astragalus onobrychis is a species of milkvetch in the family Fabaceae. It is the type species of the genus Astragalus, the largest genus of flowering plants by number of known species.

References

 
 

onobrychis
Plants described in 1753
Taxa named by Carl Linnaeus